Justice Sanders may refer to:

Joe W. Sanders, associate justice of the Louisiana Supreme Court
John Adams Sanders, associate justice of the Supreme Court of Nevada
Joseph M. Sanders, associate justice of the Supreme Court of Appeals of West Virginia
Richard B. Sanders, associate justice of the Washington State Supreme Court